Satanas may refer to:

 Satanás, a 2007 Colombian film
 Satanás (novel), a 2002 novel by Colombian writer Mario Mendoza Zambrano, on which the film was based
 Satanas (gang), a gang in California
 Satanas (genus), a genus of flies
 Satanas, nickname of a character, Justin Alastair, Duke of Avon in Georgette Heyer's book These Old Shades

See also 
Satan (disambiguation)